Keith Mildon (born 1933), also known by his ring name Keita Meretana, is a former professional wrestler and heavyweight wrestling champion of New Zealand from Wairoa, New Zealand.

Professional wrestling career
Mildon, third son of L. W. Mildon and C. Mildon of Wairoa and nephew of Ike Robin, the first professional wrestling champion of New Zealand, began wrestling in 1951. He studying wrestling with Anton Koolmann in Wellington and for eight years wrestled mainly in the East Coast, Bay of Plenty, Hawke's Bay and Wellington areas. In 1952, he was awarded the trophy for the most scientific wrestler in Gisborne.

In May 1959, at the age 26 with weights 16 stone 6 lbs, he turned professional and made his debut with two bouts against the Australian, Ricky Wallace, wrestling a draw with him at Hāwera on 30 May and defeated him on Queen's Birthday weekend in Auckland.  Afterwards, he met the team which visited New Zealand, led by Jack Bence (United States), André Drapp (France), Braka Cortez (Brazil) and several others.

On 3 October 1959, he defeated Lofty Binnie and won the NWA New Zealand Heavyweight Championship.

When the 1960 wrestling season opened in New Zealand, he challenged all the overseas visiting wrestlers: Lou Newman (United States), Herby Freeman (New York), Seymour Koenig (New York) and Ken Kenneth, a New Zealander who had returned from six years of campaigning in the United States. During 1960, he spent three months campaigning in Australia, and as a preliminary to his contests, he performed a haka. When he appeared on Australian television, he wore his full Māori regalia.

In 1961, Meretana left his native land for Honolulu under contract to promoter, Al Karasick, and then spent two years in the United States. He also competed in Great Britain, Australia and India.

Personal life
In the off-season from wrestling, he was a truck-driver in Wellington and participated in Māori Church Welfare work.

1 July 1967 over 450 guests attended his wedding to Tangiwai Tihema at the Gospel Hall, Levin. Tihema is the granddaughter of David Raunini Tatana, M.B.E. of Levin, a descendant of Te Rauparaha. After the wedding, the couple chose to live in Wellington.

Championships and accomplishments
NWA New Zealand
NWA New Zealand Heavyweight Championship (1 time)

References

External links
Picture in the magazine Te Ao Hou - The New World
New Zealand Heavyweight Title
Keith Meretana
Wedding at Levin

1933 births
20th-century professional wrestlers
New Zealand male professional wrestlers
Living people
New Zealand Māori sportspeople
People from Wairoa
Sportspeople from the Hawke's Bay Region